Verticordia comosa is a flowering plant in the myrtle family, Myrtaceae and is endemic to the south-west of Western Australia. It is an openly branched shrub with small, broad, almost round leaves and spikes of flowers that are pale yellow, sometimes with a white or pale pink centre.

Description

Flowering time is from October to January.

This species, like other verticordias, often grows with other members of the genus and sometimes hybridises with them, including with the critically endangered Verticordia spicata subsp. squamosa.

Taxonomy and naming
Verticordia comosa was first formally described by Alex George in 1991 and the description was published in Nuytsia from specimens collected near Three Springs in 1980. The specific epithet (comosa) is a Latin word meaning "downy" or "having hairs" referring to the tuft of hairs on the style.

George placed this species in subgenus Eperephes, section Pennuligera along with V. chrysostachys, V. lepidophylla, V. aereiflora, V. dichroma, V. x eurardyensis, V. muelleriana, V. argentea, V. albida, V. fragrans, V. venusta, V. forrestii, V. serotina, V. oculata, V. etheliana and V. grandis.

Distribution and habitat
This verticordia grows in deep sand and loam over gravel, usually with other verticordias in open shrubland. It occurs between Three Springs, Mingenew and Morawa in the Avon Wheatbelt and Geraldton Sandplains biogeographic regions.

Conservation
Verticordia comosa is classified as  "Priority One" by the Western Australian Government Department of Parks and Wildlife meaning that it is known from only one or a few locations which are potentially at risk.>

Use in horticulture
Verticordia comosa has proven difficult to propagate and even harder to maintain in the garden. Because of its rarity and its horticultural potential, attempts to grow the plant continue.

References

comosa
Rosids of Western Australia
Eudicots of Western Australia
Plants described in 1991